Chuk Yuen Estate is a public housing estate in Kowloon, Hong Kong, located north of Wong Tai Sin and underneath Lion Rock. Its site was formerly the Chuk Yuen Resettlement Area.

It is divided into Chuk Yuen (North) Estate and Chuk Yuen (South) Estate. The two estates have eight blocks each, and were all built in the 1980s. In 1999, some of the flats were sold to tenants through the Tenants Purchase Scheme Phase 2.

At the centre of these buildings is a shopping mall, hosting a McDonald's, 7-Eleven, Circle K, three bakeries, a street market, Watsons, a dim sum restaurant, two supermarkets and a sports centre. Beside the mall are two parks: one with a fish pond and a waterfall and the other with basketball courts and football fields.

Pang Ching Court and Ying Fuk Court fall under the Home Ownership Scheme courts near Chuk Yuen Estate, completed in 1991 and 2001 respectively. They each have one block.

Houses

Chuk Yuen (South) Estate

Chuk Yuen (North) Estate

Pang Ching Court

Ying Fuk Court

Education
The Chuk Yuen area is in Primary One Admission (POA) School Net 43. Within the school net are multiple aided schools (operated independently but funded with government money) and Wong Tai Sin Government Primary School.

See also

 Chuk Yuen
 Public housing estates in Wong Tai Sin

References

External links
 Hong Kong Housing Authority - Chuk Yuen (North) Estate
 Hong Kong Housing Authority - Chuk Yuen (South) Estate

Public housing estates in Hong Kong
Tenants Purchase Scheme
Wong Tai Sin
Chuk Yuen